Ousmane Doumbia (born 21 May 1992) is an Ivorian professional footballer who plays as a midfielder for Swiss Super League club Lugano.

Career
Doumbia began his career with Athlétic Adjamé in the Ivory Coast, before moving to Switzerland with Servette. He spent his early career in the Swiss Challenge League with Servette and Winterthur.

On 10 October 2020, Doumbia signed a professional contract with FC Zürich. he made his professional debut with Zürich in a 1–0 Swiss Super League win over FC Basel on 4 November 2020.

On 13 June 2022, Doumbia joined Lugano on a four-year contract.

Personal life
Doumbia is the brother of the Ivorian international footballer Seydou Doumbia.

References

External links
 
 SFL Profile

1992 births
Living people
Footballers from Abidjan
Ivorian footballers
Association football midfielders
Swiss Super League players
Swiss Challenge League players
Servette FC players
Yverdon-Sport FC players
FC Winterthur players
FC Zürich players
FC Lugano players
Ivorian expatriate footballers
Ivorian expatriate sportspeople in Switzerland
Expatriate footballers in Switzerland